Giovanni Battista Caproni, 1st Count of Taliedo (July 3, 1886 – October 27, 1957), known as "Gianni" Caproni, was an Italian aeronautical engineer, civil engineer, electrical engineer, and aircraft designer who founded the Caproni aircraft-manufacturing company.

Early life and education

Caproni was born on July 3, 1886 in Massone, which at the time was in Austria-Hungary but became a part of Italy in 1919. In 1907 he received a degree in civil engineering from the Technical University Munich. A year later he received a doctoral degree in electrical engineering from the University of Liège.

Career

In 1907 and 1908, Caproni gained experience in the construction of aircraft engines; he also collaborated with the Romanian aircraft designer Henri Coandă, whom he had met at lIstituto Montefiori di Liegi, in the building of sailplanes. In 1908, he founded the Caproni factory in the Taliedo district of Milan, Italy, to manufacture biplanes. In 1909 he opened an industrial airport near the Cascina Malpensa – today's Milan–Malpensa Airport – to manufacture and test his aircraft. In 1910, he designed and built his first powered aircraft, the Caproni Ca. 1, an experimental biplane which was the first aircraft built in Italy. It was destroyed during its first flight on May 27, 1910.

In 1911, the year his company was named Società de Agostini e Caproni, he switched to monoplane construction, in which he had greater success. In 1914, he tested Italys first multi-engined aircraft, a three-engine biplane later dubbed the Caproni Ca.31 . After Italy entered World War I in 1915, he devoted his efforts to designing and constructing bombers. His company later was renamed Società Caproni e Comitti.

Caproni was an early proponent of the development of passenger aircraft, and developed a variant of the Ca.4 bomber into the Ca.48 airliner. Although it made a very favorable impression on the public when first displayed, the Ca.48 probably never entered airline service, and on August 2, 1919, a Ca.48 crashed near Verona, Italy, killing everyone on board (14, 15, or 17 people, according to various sources) in Italys first commercial aviation disaster and one of the earliest – and, at the time, the deadliest – airliner accidents in history.
 In 1921, he built the prototype of a giant transatlantic passenger seaplane, the Caproni Ca.60 Noviplano, with a capacity of 100 passengers, but it proved unstable and crashed on its second flight. He also designed gliders.

Between World War I and World War II, he devoted most of his effort to the design and production of bombers and light transport aircraft, and his company manufactured the early Stipa-Caproni and Caproni Campini N.1, the ducted fan experimental aircraft which were precursors of true jet aircraft. During this period, his company became Società Italiana Caproni, a major conglomerate which purchased other manufacturers, creating subsidiaries which included Caproni Bergamasca and Caproni Vizzola, although the assertion that Caproni also purchased the Reggiane company to form a "Caproni Reggiane" subsidiary is a myth. Caproni was granted the title Conte di Taliedo (Count of Taliedo, or Earl of Taliedo) during the interwar period.

The Caproni company produced aircraft for the Regia Aeronautica (Italian Royal Air Force) during World War II – primarily bombers, transports, seaplanes, and trainers, although the Caproni Vizzola subsidiary also built several fighter prototypes.

The Società Italiana Caproni conglomerate ceased operations in 1950, although its last vestige, the Caproni Vizzola subsidiary, survived until 1983.

Death and legacy
Caproni died in Rome on October 27, 1957. His remains were transferred to his hometown of Massone where he was buried in the Caproni family grave.

In 1983, Caproni was inducted into the International Air & Space Hall of Fame at the San Diego Air & Space Museum.

See also
Gianni Caproni Museum of Aeronautics
The Wind Rises, a 2013 film in which Caproni is a character

References

1886 births
1957 deaths
Aircraft designers
Italian aerospace engineers
Italian electrical engineers
Italian civil engineers
Italian nobility
Caproni
Technical University of Munich alumni
Caproni people